Mark Gleeson (born 16 July 1982) is a former English professional rugby league footballer who played in the 2000s and 2010s. He was contracted to Halifax until the end of the National League One 2008 season.

Mark Gleeson was born in Wigan, Greater Manchester, England, and like his brother Martin, he spent seven years of his junior career in Australia after emigrating with his family aged 8, and later signed for the Warrington Wolves Academy, featuring in their 1999 under-19 Grand Final team against Leeds Rhinos, he briefly returned to Australia to play in Cairns, Queensland.

Gleeson won Sky's Man of the Match award on full début against champions the Bradford Bulls in 2001.  Gleeson re-signed for the Warrington Wolves when Paul Cullen took over as coach in time for the 2003's Super League VIII. He made his England début against France at Headingley in 2005.

In July 2008, Mark was released from his contract at the Warrington Wolves, and opted to sign for National League One side Halifax, after his contract with the Featherstone Rovers fell through. Mark was unveiled as Halifax's new signing during halftime in their match against the Leigh Centurions which was shown live on Sky Sports.

On 14 August 2008, one month after Gleeson signed for Halifax, he signed a new and improved contract until the end of the 2009 season.

Genealogical information
Mark Gleeson is the younger brother of the rugby league footballer; Martin Gleeson, and the cousin of the rugby league footballer; Sean Gleeson.

References

External links
Mark Gleeson leaves
(archived by web.archive.org) Mark Gleeson signs for Halifax

1982 births
Living people
Barrow Raiders players
English rugby league players
Halifax R.L.F.C. players
Rugby league hookers
Rugby league players from Wigan
Warrington Wolves players